Upton is a village and civil parish in West Yorkshire, England.  It had a population of 3,541 in the 2001 census.

It is situated south of Badsworth and north of North Elmsall and is part of the SESKU (South Elmsall, South Kirkby, Upton) area. The village is also in the WF9 postal area (Pontefract) and very close to the South Yorkshire boundary.

History
The village is mentioned in the Domesday Book, where it is noted as having a church. The name literally means Higher Town and is recorded as Uptune, Uptone and Opton in old documents. Historically, the village was in the wapentake of Osgoldcross and the parish of Badsworth.

In 1885, the Hull and Barnsley Railway opened a railway station at the south end of the village, which also served the community of North Elmsall. In 1924, Upton Colliery was opened to the south east of the village, but was closed in 1964 due to geological faulting and a serious explosion which required the shafts to be sealed.

A former coal mining community, regeneration is in progress as a housing overflow for the more expensive areas of Doncaster and Pontefract.

In the 1960s the village was in its prime due to the strong mining community, with retail outlets such as "Mr Farthings" Chemist, and "Mr Kings" newsagents.

Sport
The village was home to Upton Colliery F.C. who appeared in the FA Cup and featured Charlie Williams as a player.

A short-lived greyhound racing track was opened near the village by the Carters' Knottingley Brewery Co Ltd. The racing was independent (not affiliated to the sports governing body, the National Greyhound Racing Club) and was thus known as a "flapping track", which was the nickname given to independent tracks. The lease was granted in 1933 to the tenant of the Greenfield Hotel, who wanted to attract the local mining community. The Greenfield Hotel and track are believed to have closed during World War II, with the six-acre site being made available for housing in 1947. The Carters' Knottingley Brewery Co Ltd also leased out greyhound tracks at Great Houghton and Pontefract.

Notable people
Recent recognised villagers include playwright John Godber, and Ada Mason (formerly the oldest living woman in England).

See also
Listed buildings in Upton, West Yorkshire

References

External links

 
Villages in West Yorkshire
Geography of the City of Wakefield
Civil parishes in West Yorkshire